Jermar Jefferson (born April 15, 2000) is an American football running back for the Detroit Lions of the National Football League (NFL). He played college football at Oregon State and was drafted by the Lions in the seventh round of the 2021 NFL Draft.

Early years 
Jefferson initially attended high school at Redondo Union High School in Redondo Beach, California, before transferring to Narbonne High School in Harbor City, California in his senior year. Jefferson received an offer from and committed to Oregon State University in his senior year, while also receiving an offer to play football at the University of Southern California. Jefferson enrolled at OSU in 2018.

College career

2018 
Jefferson became the school's starting running back as a true freshman and rushed for 238 yards in his second game, a 48–25 win against Southern Utah. Three weeks later, he rushed for a career-high 254 yards in a 52–24 loss to Arizona State. Through the first six games of his freshman season, Jefferson ranked third among all Division I FBS players with 865 rushing yards. Jefferson ended the season with twelve touchdown runs, 1,380 rushing yards, and was named Pac-12 freshman offensive player of the year.

2019 
Jefferson returned to the Beavers for his sophomore season in 2019. He rushed for 685 yards and eight touchdowns in his sophomore year.

2020 
Jefferson returned to the Beavers for his junior season in 2020. He finished with 858 rushing yards and six rushing touchdowns in just six games. After the season, he decided to forgo his senior year and enter the 2021 NFL Draft.

Professional career

Jefferson was drafted in the seventh round, 257th overall, by the Detroit Lions in the 2021 NFL Draft. He signed his four-year rookie contract on May 14, 2021. On October 31, 2021, Jefferson scored his first career touchdown, an eight-yard rush in a blowout loss against the Philadelphia Eagles that proved to be the only points for the Lions in the 44-6 loss. He appeared in seven games and recorded 15 carries for 74 rushing yards and two rushing touchdowns in the 2021 season.

On August 31, 2022, Jefferson was waived by the Lions and signed to the practice squad the next day. He signed a reserve/future contract on January 9, 2023.

References

External links
Detroit Lions bio
Oregon State Beavers bio

Living people
American football running backs
Oregon State Beavers football players
People from Harbor City, Los Angeles
Players of American football from Los Angeles
2000 births
Detroit Lions players